The pink lanternshark (Etmopterus dianthus) is a shark of the family Etmopteridae found around Australia and New Caledonia, at depths of between 110 and 880 m.  Its length is up to 41 cm.

Reproduction is ovoviviparous.

References

 
 Compagno, Dando, & Fowler, Sharks of the World, Princeton University Press, New Jersey 2005 

Taxa named by Peter R. Last
Taxa named by George H. Burgess
Taxa named by Bernard Séret
Fish described in 2002
Etmopterus